The Nordic Bronze Age (also Northern Bronze Age, or Scandinavian Bronze Age) is a period of Scandinavian prehistory from c. 2000/1750–500 BC.

The Nordic Bronze Age culture emerged about 1750 BC as a continuation of the Battle Axe culture (the Scandinavian Corded Ware variant) as well as from influence that came from Central Europe. This influence most likely came from people similar to those of the Unetice culture, since they brought customs that were derived from Unetice or from local interpretations of the Unetice culture located in North Western Germany. The metallurgical influences from Central Europe are especially noticeable. The Bronze Age in Scandinavia can be said to begin shortly after 2000 BC with the introduction and use of bronze tools, followed by a more systematic adoption of bronze metalworking technology from 1750 BC.

The Nordic Bronze Age maintained close trade links with Mycenaean Greece, with whom it shares several striking similarities. Some cultural similarities between the Nordic Bronze Age, the Sintashta/Andronovo culture and peoples of the Rigveda have also been detected. The Nordic Bronze Age region included part of northern Germany, and some scholars also include sites in what is now Estonia, Finland and Pomerania as part of its cultural sphere.

The people of the Nordic Bronze Age were actively engaged in the export of amber, and imported metals in return, becoming expert metalworkers. With respect to the number and density of metal deposits, the Nordic Bronze Age became the richest culture in Europe during its existence.

Around the 5th century BC, the Nordic Bronze Age was succeeded by the Pre-Roman Iron Age and the Jastorf culture. The Nordic Bronze Age is often considered ancestral to the Germanic peoples.

History

Origins
The Nordic Bronze Age is a successor of the Corded Ware culture in southern Scandinavia and Northern Germany. It appears to represent a fusion of elements from the Corded Ware culture and the preceding Pitted Ware culture. The decisive factor that triggered the change from the Chalcolithic Battle Axe culture into the Nordic Bronze Age is often believed to have been metallurgical influence as well as general cultural influence from Central Europe, similar in custom to those of the Unetice culture.

Chronology
Oscar Montelius, who coined the term used for the period, divided it into six distinct sub-periods in his piece Om tidsbestämning inom bronsåldern med särskilt avseende på Skandinavien ("On Bronze Age dating with particular focus on Scandinavia") published in 1885, which is still in wide use. His relative chronology has held up well against radiocarbon dating, with the exception that the period's start is closer to 1700 BC than 1800 BC, as Montelius suggested. For Central Europe a different system developed by Paul Reinecke is commonly used, as each area has its own artifact types and archaeological periods.

A broader subdivision is the Early Bronze Age, between 1700 BC and 1100 BC, and the Late Bronze Age, 1100 BC to 550 BC. These divisions and periods are followed by the Pre-Roman Iron Age.

Culture

Settlements
Settlement in the Nordic Bronze Age period consisted mainly of single farmsteads, which usually consisted of a longhouse plus additional four-post built structures (helms). Longhouses were initially two aisled, and after c. 1300 BC three aisled structure became normal. Some longhouses were exceptionally large (up to about 500 m2 in area), and have been described as "chiefly halls", "the sitting area of which is the size of a megaron in contemporary Mycenean palaces". Larger settlements are also known (such as Hallunda and Apalle in Sweden and Voldtofte in Denmark), as well as fortified sites, specialist workshops for metalwork and ceramic production, and dedicated cult houses. Settlements were geographically located on higher ground, and tended to be concentrated near the sea. Certain settlements functioned as regional centres of power, trade, craft production, and ritual activity. The Bronze Age fortified town of Hünenburg bei Watenstedt in northern Germany (12th c. BC) has been described as a trading post for people from Scandinavia and the Baltic Sea region, as well as a cult centre and seat of a ruling elite.

Burials

Associated with Nordic Bronze Age settlements are burial cairns, mounds and cemeteries, with interments including oak coffins and urn burials; other settlement associations include rock carvings, or bronze hoards in wetland sites. Some burial mounds are especially large and, with respect to the amount of gold and bronze in them, extraordinarily rich for this time period. Examples of prominent burial mounds include the Håga mound and Kivik King's Grave in Sweden, and the Lusehøj in Denmark. A minimum of 50,000 burial mounds were constructed between 1500 and 1150 BC in Denmark alone.

Oak coffin burials dating from the 14th-13th centuries BC contained well-preserved mummified bodies, along with their clothing and burial goods. The bodies were intentionally mummified by watering the burial mounds to create a bog-like, oxygen-free environment within the graves. This practice may have been stimulated by cultural influence from Egypt, as it coincided with the appearance of Egyptian artefacts in Scandinavia and the appearance of Baltic amber in Egypt (e.g. in the tomb of Tutankhamun). However, intentional mummification within oak coffin burials has also been noted in Britain at an earlier date (c. 2300 BC).

The Late Bronze Age King's Grave of Seddin in northern Germany (9th century BC) has been described as a "Homeric burial" due to its close similarity to contemporary elite burials in Greece and Italy.

Agriculture
In the Nordic Bronze Age, both agriculture (including cultivation of wheat, millet, and barley) and animal husbandry (keeping of domesticated animals such as cattle, sheep and pigs) were practiced.  Fishing and hunting were also sources of food, which included shellfish, deer, elk, and other wild animals. There is evidence that oxen were used as draught animals; domesticated dogs were common, but horses were rarer and probably status symbols.

Metalwork
Scandinavian Bronze Age sites present a rich and well-preserved legacy of bronze and gold objects. These valuable metals were all imported, primarily from Central Europe, but they were often crafted locally and the craftsmanship and metallurgy of the Nordic Bronze Age was of a high standard. The lost-wax casting method was used to produce artefacts such as the Trundholm Sun Chariot and the Langstrup belt plate. The archaeological legacy also encompasses locally crafted wool and wooden objects.

During the 15th and 14th centuries BC, southern Scandinavia produced and deposited more elaborate bronzes in graves and hoards than any other region of Europe. As regards the number and density of metal deposits, the Nordic Bronze Age became the richest culture in Europe. More Bronze Age swords have also been found in Denmark than anywhere else in Europe. Uniform crucibles found at metal workshop sites further indicate the mass production of certain metal artefacts.

Rock carvings 
The west coast of Sweden, namely Bohuslän, has the largest concentration of Bronze Age rock carvings in Scandinavia; and Scandinavia has the largest number of Bronze Age rock carvings in Europe. The west coast of Sweden is home to around 1,500 recorded rock engraving sites, with more being discovered every year. When the rock carvings were made, the area was the coastline; but it is now 25 meters above sea level. The engravings in the region depict everyday life, weapons, human figures, fishing nets, ships, chariots, plows, the sun, deer, bulls, horses, and birds. By far, the most dominant theme is human figures and ships, especially ships  —  10,000 of which have recorded. The typical ship depicts a crew of six to thirteen. Rock carvings in the late Bronze Age, and even the early Iron Age, often depict conflict, power, and mobility.

Warrior ethos

The culture of the Nordic Bronze Age was that of a warrior culture, with a strong emphasis on weapons and status. Helle Vandkilde of Aarhus University, in her publications from 1995, describes most men of the period as having followed a warrior ethos. More than 70% of burials dating to the Nordic Bronze Age contain metal objects of various kinds, the most common objects being swords and daggers. It is noted that the people of the Nordic Bronze Age also placed great importance on helmets of intricate design, which they put much effort into making. However, not all of the weapons and armour of the Nordic Bronze Age were used for warfare. Some of them are believed to have been ceremonial, especially the helmets.

Despite the importance of weapons in their society, archaeological discoveries suggest that intrasocietal violence was not particularly common in the Nordic Bronze Age, especially not when compared to contemporary European Bronze Age cultures. The people of the Nordic Bronze Age seem to instead have been directing their military efforts outwards, likely against people of neighbouring cultures, and are believed to have participated in battles along the Amber Road and other trade routes that were important for the continuous prosperity of their society.

Many of the stone carvings from the Nordic Bronze Age depict boats in great numbers as well as groups of armed men manning the boats. Finds such as the Hjortspring boat, among others, give further credence to the theory that Bronze Age people in Scandinavia relied heavily on naval dominance of the waters surrounding their region in order to secure trade and safety.

Ancient DNA and archaeological evidence indicates that people from the Nordic Bronze Age sphere were involved in the conflict at the Tollense valley battlefield in northern Germany (13th century BC), "the largest excavated and archaeologically verifiable battle site of this age in the world".

International contacts
The Nordic Bronze Age maintained intimate trade links with the Tumulus culture and Mycenaean Greece. The Nordic Bronze Age exported amber through the Amber Road, and imported metals in return. During the time of the Nordic Bronze Age, metals, such as copper, tin and gold, were imported into Scandinavia on a massive scale. Copper was imported from Sardinia, Iberia and Cyprus. The trade network was briefly disrupted during the Late Bronze Age collapse in the 12th century BC.

Evidence for horse-drawn chariots appears in Scandinavia c. 1700 BC, around the same time as it appears in Greece. In both cases the chariots appear to have come from the region of the Carpathian Basin or the western steppe. Chariot bits and whip handles in Denmark dating from this time feature the same curvilinear designs that are found on contemporary artefacts from the Carpathian Basin and in the elite shaft graves at Mycenae. These designs subsequently appear on Nordic Bronze Age metalwork, including on the gold disc of the Trundholm Sun Chariot. Depictions of chariots also appear in Scandinavian rock art dating from c. 1700, as they do on engraved stone stelae from Mycenae. The introduction of the chariot in Scandinavia coincided with the introduction of socketed spearheads, whose origin Vandkilde (2014) ascribes to the Seima-Turbino culture.

During the 15th–14th centuries BC the Nordic Bronze Age and Mycenaean Greece shared the use of similar flange-hilted swords, as well as select elements of shared lifestyle, such as campstools, drinking vessels decorated with solar symbols, and tools for body care including razors and tweezers. This "Mycenaean package", including spiral decoration, was directly adopted in southern Scandinavia after 1500 BC, creating "a specific and selective Nordic variety of Mycenaean high culture" that was not adopted in the intermediate region of Central Europe. These similarities can not have come about without intimate contacts, probably through the travels of warriors and mercenaries. Archaeological evidence further indicates the existence in both regions of shared institutions linked to warriors. Specifically, the dual organisation of leadership between a Wanax and a Lawagetas in Mycenaean Greece was apparently replicated in the Nordic Bronze Age. However this dual organization may have also been part of a shared Indo-European tradition. Other similarities have been noted in artistic iconography from both regions and its associated cosmology. Some of the contacts between Scandinavia and Greece were probably conveyed through Central Europe. 

Trade and cultural contacts have also been noted between the Nordic Bronze Age and New Kingdom Egypt.

The contacts during the Late Bronze Age (period IV-VI) were more intensive with Central Europe and Italy. A lot of similarities are seen in art and iconography between different continental Urnfield cultures and the Hallstatt culture. Copper was imported from Central Europe and Italy.

Religion and cult
There is no coherent knowledge about the Nordic Bronze Age religion, its pantheon, world view and how it was practised. Written sources are lacking, but archaeological finds draw a vague and fragmented picture of the religious practices and the nature of the religion of this period. Only some possible sects and only certain possible tribes are known. Some of the best clues come from tumuli, elaborate artifacts, votive offerings and rock carvings scattered across Northern Europe.

Many finds indicate a strong sun-worshipping cult in the Nordic Bronze Age and various animals have been associated with the sun's movement across the sky, including horses, birds, snakes and marine creatures (see also Sól).

A female or mother goddess is believed to have been widely worshipped (see Nerthus). There have been several finds of fertility symbols.

Hieros gamos rites may have been common.

A pair of twin gods are believed to have been worshipped, and is reflected in a duality in all things sacred: where sacrificial artifacts have been buried they are often found in pairs. Sacrifices (animals, weapons, jewellery and humans) often had a strong connection to bodies of water.

Boglands, ponds, streams or lakes were often used as ceremonial and holy places for sacrifices and many artifacts have been found in such locations.

There are many rock carving sites from this period. The rock carvings have been dated through comparison with depicted artifacts, for example bronze axes and swords. Many rock carvings are uncanny in resemblance to those found in the Corded Ware culture. There are also numerous Nordic Stone Age rock carvings, those of northern Scandinavia mostly portray elk.

Ritual instruments such as bronze lurs have been uncovered, especially in the region of Denmark and western Sweden. Lur horns are also depicted in several rock carvings and are believed to have been used in ceremonies.

Remnants of the Bronze Age religion and mythology are believed to exist in Norse mythology and wider Germanic mythology, such as Skinfaxi and Hrímfaxi and Nerthus, and it is believed to itself be descended from the earlier Indo-European religion.

Seamanship
Thousands of rock carvings from the Nordic Bronze Age depict ships, and the large stone burial monuments known as stone ships. Those sites suggest that ships and seafaring played an important role in the culture at large. The depicted ships, most likely represents sewn plank built canoes used for warfare, fishing and trade. These ship types may have their origin as far back as the neolithic period and they continue into the Pre-Roman Iron Age, as exemplified by the Hjortspring boat. 3,600-year-old bronze axes and other tools made from Cypriot copper have been found in the region.

Researchers note that there is great continuity in the way that ships continuously had a strong importance in Scandinavian society. The boat building and seafaring traditions that were established during the Nordic Bronze Age lasted throughout the ages and were further developed upon during the Iron Age. Some archaeologists and historians believe that the culmination of this sea-focused culture was the Viking Age.

Climate
The Nordic Bronze Age was initially characterized by a warm climate that began with a climate change around 2700 BC. The climate was comparable to that of present-day central Germany and northern France and permitted a fairly dense population and good opportunities for farming; for example, grapes were grown in Scandinavia at this time. A minor change in climate occurred between 850 BC and 760 BC, introducing a wetter, colder climate and a more radical climate change began around 650 BC.

Genetics 

A June 2015 study published in Nature found the people of the Nordic Bronze Age to be closely genetically related to the Corded Ware culture, the Beaker culture and the Unetice culture. People of the Nordic Bronze Age and Corded Ware show the highest lactose tolerance among Bronze Age Europeans. The study suggested that the Sintashta culture, and its succeeding Andronovo culture, represented an eastward migration of Corded Ware peoples. 

In the June 2015 study, the remains of nine individuals of the Northern Bronze Age and earlier Neolithic cultures in Denmark and Sweden from ca. 2850 BC to 500 BC, were analyzed. Among the Neolithic individuals, the three males were found to be carrying haplogroup I1, R1a1a1 and R1b1a1a2a1a1. Among the individuals from the Nordic Bronze Age, two males carried I1, while two carried R1b1a1a2.

See also

 Bronze Age Europe
 Bronze Age sword
 Egtved Girl
 The King's Grave
 Stone ships
 Tanumshede
 Pomeranian culture
 Single Grave culture

Notes

References

Bibliography

 
Dabrowski, J. (1989) Nordische Kreis un Kulturen Polnischer Gebiete. Die Bronzezeit im Ostseegebiet. Ein Rapport der Kgl. Schwedischen Akademie der Literatur Geschichte und Alter unt Altertumsforschung über das Julita-Symposium 1986. Ed Ambrosiani, B. Kungl. Vitterhets Historie och Antikvitets Akademien. Konferenser 22. Stockholm.
Davidson, H. R. Ellis and Gelling, Peter: The Chariot of the Sun and other Rites and Symbols of the Northern European Bronze Age.
K. Demakopoulou (ed.), Gods and Heroes of the European Bronze Age, published on the occasion of the exhibition "Gods and Heroes of the Bronze Age. Europe at the Time of Ulysses", from 19 December 1998, to 5 April 1999, at the National Museum of Denmark, Copenhagen, London (1999), .
Demougeot, E. La formation de l'Europe et les invasions barbares, Paris: Editions Montaigne, 1969–1974.
 
 
 
 
 
 
 
 
Kaliff, Anders. 2001. Gothic Connections. Contacts between eastern Scandinavia and the southern Baltic coast 1000 BC – 500 AD.
 
 
 
 
 
 
 Montelius, Oscar, 1885. Om tidsbestämning inom bronsåldern med särskilt avseende på Skandinavien.
 Musset, L. Les invasions: les vagues germanique, Paris: Presses universitaires de France, 1965.
 
 
 
 
 
 
 

 
Archaeological cultures of Northern Europe
Bronze Age cultures of Europe
Indo-European archaeological cultures
Archaeological cultures in Denmark
Archaeological cultures in Germany
Archaeological cultures in Norway
Archaeological cultures in Poland
Archaeological cultures in Sweden
Prehistoric Scandinavia
History of Schleswig-Holstein
2nd-millennium BC establishments
5th-century BC disestablishments